Spider-Man's Greatest Villains is a graphic novel edited by Sarra Mossoff published by Boxtree in 1995.

Contents
Spider-Man's Greatest Villains is a compilation which features eight stories that pit Spider-Man against adversaries including Kingpin, Vulture, Hobgoblin and Dr. Octopus in stories that span three decades, from 1964 to 1994.

Reception
Cliff Ramshaw reviewed Spider-Man's Greatest Villains for Arcane magazine, rating it a 7 out of 10 overall. Ramshaw comments that "On the whole, the artwork is functional rather than fancy, the plots are focused, the one-liners witty, and the fights frantic. Greatest Villains is not to be missed, if only for the preposterously piquant Peter Parker alliterations."

References

Marvel Comics graphic novels